Arizona Charter Academy (ACA) is a coeducational, public charter school located in Surprise, Arizona, USA. The school population is largely from the cities of El Mirage, Surprise, Peoria, Youngtown and Glendale. ACA provides instructions for students in grades kindergarten through 8th grade. The school's stated mission is to provide all students with purpose, character, and excellence in education through parental involvement, community collaboration and career exploration. ACA has been designated by the Arizona Learns Achievement Profile as "Performing Plus". It was a candidate for accreditation by the now dissolved North Central Association. The school mascot is a bulldog. Starting in the 2017–2018 school year, this school has dropped the high school portion of the school, making it a K-8 school.

Extracurricular activities

Service learning opportunities
Service learning opportunities include the Mexico House Building Trip (open to qualified high school students: twenty staff and students journey to Puerto Peñasco, Mexico to build a home for a family living in poverty), Habitat for Humanity (where students help construct a house for a family in their community), the West Side Food Bank and the Annual Blood Drive for United Blood Services.

Athletics
The school is a member of the Arizona Interscholastic Association.

References

External links
 Arizona Charter Academy

Public high schools in Arizona
Public middle schools in Arizona
Public elementary schools in Arizona
Schools in Maricopa County, Arizona
Charter schools in Arizona